William T. (Bill) Armstrong (1929 – March 25, 2005) was president of the Canadian Broadcasting Corporation from August to October 1989 following the retirement of Pierre Juneau. He served within CBC for 33 years and retired in 1992. His career was diverse and extensive:

 Supervisor of Information 1958-1959
 Director of Information Services 1959-1966
 Director of Corporate Relations 1967-1969
 Director, Ottawa Area 1969 to 1973
 Vice-President, Public Relations at Head Office 1973 to 1975
 Managing Director of Radio 1975-1979
 Assistant general manager, CBC English Services 1979-1981
 General manager of Roy Thomson Hall 1981-1982
 Executive vice-president of CBC/Radio-Canada 1982 to 1989
 Regional Director for CBC Ontario 1989-1992

References
 WT Armstrong

1929 births
2005 deaths
Presidents of the Canadian Broadcasting Corporation
20th-century Canadian civil servants